The Berothidae are a family of winged insects of the order Neuroptera. They are known commonly as the beaded lacewings. The family was first named by Anton Handlirsch in 1906. The family consists of 24 genera and 110 living species distributed discontinuously worldwide, mostly in tropical and subtropical regions. Numerous extinct species have also been described. Their ecology is poorly known, but in the species where larval stages have been documented, the larvae are predators of termites.

Systematics
The peculiar genus Lomamyia cannot be robustly assigned to any one subfamily. In addition, a considerable fossil diversity of beaded lacewings is known from the Late Jurassic onwards, containing numerous genera which are likewise basal or incertae sedis.

Extant genera 
Asadeteva Aspöck & Aspöck, 1981
Austroberothella Aspöck & Aspöck, 1985
Berlekrumyia Aspöck & Aspöck, 1988
Berotha Walker, 1860
Berothimerobius Monserrat & Deretsky, 1999
Cyrenoberotha MacLeod & Adams, 1968
Isoscelipteron Costa, 1863
Lekrugeria Navás, 1929
Lomamyia Banks, 1904
Manselliberotha Aspöck & Aspöck, 1988
Naizema Navás, 1919
Nodalla Navás, 1926
Nosybus Navás, 1910
Nyrma Navás, 1933
Ormiscocerus Blanchard, 1851
Podallea Navás, 1936
Protobiella Tillyard, 1923
Quasispermophorella Aspöck & Aspöck, 1986
Spermophorella Tillyard, 1916
Spiroberotha Adams, 1990
Stenobiella Tillyard, 1916
Tanzanberotha Aspöck & Hynd, 1995
Trichoberotha Handschin, 1935
Trichoma Tillyard, 1916

Extinct genera 

 †Ansoberotha Yang et al. 2019 Burmese amber, Myanmar, Late Cretaceous (Cenomanian)
 †Araripeberotha Martins-Neto and Vulcano 1990 Crato Formation, Brazil, Early Cretaceous (Aptian)
 †Banoberotha Whalley 1980 Lebanese amber, Early Cretaceous (Barremian)
 †Caririberotha Martins-Neto and Vulcano 1990 Crato Formation, Brazil, Aptian
†Cantabroberotha Pérez-de la Fuente, Peñalver & Engel, 2020, Spanish amber, Early Cretaceous (Albian)
 †Cornoberotha Yang et al. 2019 Burmese amber, Myanmar, Cenomanian
 †Dasyberotha Engel and Grimaldi 2008 Burmese amber, Myanmar, Cenomanian
 †Elektroberotha Makarkin and Ohl 2015 Baltic amber, Eocene
 †Epimesoberotha Jepson et al. 2012 Lulworth Formation, United Kingdom, Early Cretaceous (Berriasian)
 †Ethiroberotha Engel and Grimaldi 2008 Burmese amber, Myanmar, Cenomanian
†Haploberotha Engel and Grimaldi 2008 Burmese amber, Myanmar, Cenomanian
†Iceloberotha Engel and Grimaldi 2008 Burmese amber, Myanmar, Cenomanian
†Jersiberotha Grimaldi 2000 Burmese amber, Myanmar, Cenomanian New Jersey amber, Late Cretaceous (Turonian)
†Krokhathone Khramov 2015 Karabastau Formation, Kazakhstan, Middle/Late Jurassic (Callovian/Oxfordian)
†Maculaberotha Yuan et al. 2016 Burmese amber, Myanmar, Cenomanian 
†Magniberotha Yuan et al. 2016 Burmese amber, Myanmar, Cenomanian 
†subfamily Mesithoninae Panfilov 1980 
†Berothone Khramov 2015 Karabastau Formation, Kazakhstan, Callovian/Oxfordian
†Mesithone Panfilov 1980 Karabastau Formation, Kazakhstan, Callovian/Oxfordian Zaza Formation, Turga Formation, Russia, Aptian
†Pseudosisyra Makarkin 1999 Zaza Formation, Russia, Aptian
†Microberotha Archibald and Makarkin 2004 Hat Creek amber, Canada, Eocene (Ypresian)
†Nascimberotha Grimaldi 2000 New Jersey amber, Turonian
†Oloberotha Ren and Guo 1996 Yixian Formation, China, Aptian
†Osmyloberotha Khramov 2021 Burmese amber, Myanmar, Cenomanian
†Protoberotha Huang et al. 2019 Burmese amber, Myanmar, Cenomanian
†Sibelliberotha Azar and Nel 2013 Lebanese amber, Barremian
†Sinosmylites Hong 1983 Daohugou, Haifanggou Formation, China, Callovian, Karabastau Formation, Kazakhstan, Callovian/Oxfordian, Ulaan-Ereg Formation, Mongolia, Late Jurassic (Tithonian)
†Systenoberotha Engel and Grimaldi 2008 Burmese amber, Myanmar, Cenomanian
†Telistoberotha Engel and Grimaldi 2008 Burmese amber, Myanmar, Cenomanian
†Xiaoberotha Shi et al. 2019 Burmese amber, Myanmar, Cenomanian
 †Xenoberotha Makarkin 2017 Green River Formation, United States, Eocene

References 

 Bugguide.net. Family Berothidae - Beaded Lacewings

Mantispoidea
Taxa named by Anton Handlirsch
Neuroptera families